Leeb is a surname. It may refer to:

People
Anton Joseph Leeb (1769-1837), a mayor of Vienna
Bill Leeb (born 1966), Austrian-Canadian electronic musician and record producer
Brad Leeb (born 1979), Cree First Nations Canadian ice hockey player
Carlos Leeb (born 1968), Argentine football player and manager
Emil Leeb (1881–1969), German general during World War II
Greg Leeb (born 1977), Canadian ice hockey player
Stephen Leeb (born 1946), American economist and author
Thomas Leeb (born 1977), Austrian fingerstyle guitarist
Tom Leeb (born 1989), French actor, singer and comedian representing France 2020 Eurovision Song Contest
Wilhelm Ritter von Leeb (1876–1956), German field marshal in World War II

See also
Leeb rebound hardness test
Lieb (disambiguation)
Liebe, a surname